Garmi Angut (also Romanized as Garmī Angūt; also known as Garmī) is a village in Angut-e Sharqi Rural District of the Central District of Ungut County, Ardabil province, Iran. Prior to the formation of the county, the village and rural district were in Angut District of Germi County for the following three censuses: at the 2006 census, its population was 504 in 100 households. The following census in 2011 counted 517 people in 112 households. The latest census in 2016 showed a population of 491 people in 135 households; it was the largest village in its rural district.

References 

Populated places in Ardabil Province